Kalam or Ilm al-Kalam (lit. "science of discourse") is a term for methodic theology in Islam.

Kalam may also refer to:

Philosophy
Kalam cosmological argument, a cosmological argument for the existence of God rooted in the Ilm al-Kalam heritage
Jewish Kalam, an early medieval style of Jewish philosophy that evolved in response to the Islamic Kalam, which in turn was a reaction against Aristotelian philosophy

Languages
Kalam languages, a small family of languages spoken in New Guinea
Kalam language, one of the Kalam languages spoken in New Guinea

Places
Kalam (union council), an administrative unit in Swat district, Khyber Pakhtunkhwa, Pakistan
Kalam Valley, a valley along the upper reaches of the Swat River in Khyber Pakhtunkhwa, Pakistan
Kalam, East Azerbaijan, a village in East Azerbaijan Province, Iran
Kalam, Hormozgan, a village in Hormozgan Province, Iran
Kolm-e Bala, a village in Ilam Province, Iran
Kolm-e Pain, a village in Ilam Province, Iran

People
Kalam Bey (died 1307), first ruler of Karasids Emirate
Kalam Mooniaruck (born 1983), English-born Mauritian footballer
A. P. J. Abdul Kalam (1931–2015), an Indian scientist and former President of India
Abul Kalam Azad (1888–1958), an Indian scholar and senior political leader of the Indian independence movement
Murad Kalam, American Muslim writer
Shahrom Kalam (born 1985), Malaysian footballer
Tõnu Kalam, American orchestral pianist and conductor
Mir Kalam (born 1990), Pakistani-Pashtun politician

See also
 Qalam (disambiguation)
 Kalam Institute of Technology, in Berhampur, Ganjam, Odisha, India
 Kalam TV, a social networking website, based primarily on video sharing
 Kalam summer festival, a cultural and recreational event, held annually in the scenic valley of Kalam and Mahodand